白山 may refer to the following locations in East Asia:

Baishan (白山市), prefecture-level city in Jilin, China
Hakusan, Ishikawa (白山市), a city in Ishikawa, Japan
Paektu Mountain (长白山/長白山 in Chinese), a stratovolcano on the China-North Korea border, and the tallest mountain in the latter nation
Mount Haku (白山), an inactive volcano on the borders of Gifu, Fukui and Ishikawa prefectures in Japan

See also
白山市 (disambiguation)